Daviesia umbonata is a species of flowering plant in the family Fabaceae and is endemic to the south-west of Western Australia. It is a bushy, openly-branched shrub with narrowly elliptic to narrowly egg-shaped, sharply pointed phyllodes and yellow and red flowers.

Description

Taxonomy
Daviesia umbonata was first formally described in 1997 by Gregory T. Chandler and Michael Crisp in Australian Systematic Botany from specimens collected by Crisp near Moonijin in 1980. The specific epithet (umbonata) means "bossed" referring to bulges near the sepal lobes.

Distribution and habitat
This daviesia grows in kwongan north from the Wongan Hills-Manmanning area in the Avon Wheatbelt, Geraldton Sandplains and Jarrah Forest bioregions of south-western Western Australia.

Conservation status
Daviesia umbonata is classified as "not threatened" by the Western Australian Government Department of Biodiversity, Conservation and Attractions.

References

umbonata
Taxa named by Michael Crisp
Plants described in 1997
Flora of Western Australia